Joan Daniel Ferrer (February 20, 1907 – October 27, 2008) was a Spanish-Brazilian actor and singer.

Biography 
Joan was born in Barcelona, Spain. His family emigrated to Argentina when he was a child. Later, in 1929, he settled in Brazil, where he married Argentine actress Mary Daniel, with whom he had two children, the Brazilian actor and director Daniel Filho and Cláudia Daniel.

Career 
He was a producer on José Bonifácio de Oliveira Sobrinho's team on TV Tupi and later on TV Globo, where he participated in telenovelas such as O Bem-Amado (1973), Selva de Pedra (1972), O Casarão and O Gato Comeu (1985).

In the cinema he appeared in O Casal (1975) and Xuxa e Os Trapalhões in O Mistério de Robin Hood (1990).

Death 
He died on October 27, 2008, at age 101, due to kidney failure.

References

External links

1937 births
2008 deaths
People from Barcelona
Brazilian male telenovela actors
Brazilian male film actors
20th-century Brazilian male singers
20th-century Brazilian singers
Spanish emigrants to Argentina
Spanish emigrants to Brazil
Naturalized citizens of Brazil
People from Rio de Janeiro (city)
Brazilian centenarians
Deaths from kidney failure
Men centenarians